Paula Hammond may refer to:

Paula T. Hammond (born 1963), American chemical engineer
Paula Christine Hammond (1944–2017), British magistrate and businesswoman